A total lunar eclipse took place on Thursday, September 6, 1979, the second of two lunar eclipses in 1979. A shallow total eclipse saw the Moon in relative darkness for 44 minutes and 24.7 seconds. The Moon was 9.358% of its diameter into the Earth's umbral shadow, and should have been significantly darkened. The partial eclipse lasted for 3 hours, 11 minutes and 54.1 seconds in total.

This event followed the annular solar eclipse of August 22, 1979.

Visibility 
It was completely visible over Eastern Asia, Australia, Pacific and the Americas, seen rising over East Asia, Borneo Island and Australia and setting over the Americas.

Related lunar eclipses

Eclipses in 1979 
 A total solar eclipse on Monday, 26 February 1979.
 A partial lunar eclipse on Tuesday, 13 March 1979.
 An annular solar eclipse on Wednesday, 22 August 1979.
 A total lunar eclipse on Thursday, 6 September 1979.

Lunar year series

Saros series
It is part of Saros series 137.

Half-Saros cycle
A lunar eclipse will be preceded and followed by solar eclipses by 9 years and 5.5 days (a half saros). This lunar eclipse is related to two annular solar eclipses of Solar Saros 144.

See also 
List of lunar eclipses
List of 20th-century lunar eclipses
Solar eclipse of February 26, 1979

Notes

External links 
 
 September 6, 1979, a Lunar Eclipse

1979-09
1979 in science
September 1979 events